The Strona di Mosso is a  long creek in the Piedmont region of northwest Italy.

Etymology
The name Strona should come from storn or strom, celtic roots for flowing waters or river.

Geography 
The river starts in the Biellese Alps near Bocchetto Sessera, a mountain pass connecting its valley with Val Sessera. 
Flowing initially from northwest to southeast it reaches Valle Mosso, where it encircles Monte Rovella and turns southwards. In Cossato it gets out of the Alps and enters into the Po plain. After receiving from the right its main tributary, the Quargnasca, it flows into the river Cervo.

Floods 

The river caused severe destruction and 58 casualties in 1968 along the Strona Valley.

References

See also 
 Valle Strona di Mosso
 Alpi Biellesi

Rivers of the Province of Biella
Rivers of Italy
Rivers of the Alps